Fanum d'Aron is a fanum, or Romano-Celtic temple, located in Aurillac, a French commune in the Auvergne region.

Site and status 
Discovered in 1970 in the southwest of Aurillac, the temple was excavated from May 1977 through the end of 1978 and added to the monuments historiques registry in 1980. It is situated in what is now a small municipal garden, between a pavilion and the Lescudilier industrial zone (cadastre BE n°360).

History 
Salvage excavations have recovered rich materials from the site, including lapidary pieces, glass and metallic artifacts,  coins, eight column capitals (four of which feature sculpted trachyte heads representing the Sun and Moon), a fluted column barrel fragment, and ceramics as well as terracotta antefixes. These objects establish that the temple would have been in use from the 1st to 3rd centuries CE.

Some artifacts and architectural elements from the site are kept on display at the Aurillac Museum of Art and Archeology, along with a model reconstruction of the fanum.

Architecture 
The fanum is a circular chamber (cella) surrounded by a sixteen-sided polygonal ambulatory or gallery, which opens onto the Cère and Jordanne River valleys. The angles of the polygon are marked by the bases of fluted columns (eight of which are found in-place) bearing acanthus-leafed Corinthian capitals. Terracotta antefixes found at the site give some indication of the roofing materials and design. The complex appears to have had a courtyard encircled by a perimeter wall that was discovered through sondage, towards the northwest. The wall is 55 meters (~180.5 ft) from the fanum, with a northwest-northeast orientation erected over a length of 84 meters (~275.6 ft). There is also vestiges of a partially exposed, square enclosure with paved ground southeast of the fanum, whose sides are 29 meters (~95 ft) long. The structure is speculated to perhaps have been an annex of the sanctuary, a shelter for receiving pilgrims, or even another fanum.

Fanum d'Aron appears uncommon in Arverni and Vellavi territory for having a polygonal rather than quadrangular ambulatory, and unique for the ambulatory being of sixteen sides. Another fanum found at Mauriac (Cantal) can be compared for appearing to have had a round cella and decagonal ambulatory. This uncommon round cella with polygonal ambulatory plan seems to be more typical of Western Gaul than elsewhere, as it is also found in examples at Saint-Gervais (Vendée) and  Chassenon (Charente).

Related sites 
A prospection of the Cantal département made by Alphonse Vinatié (1924 - 2005), a local archaeologist, made it possible to identify three other ancient sanctuaries in Landeyrat and Allanche, as well as possible sites in Celles, Charmensac, and Mauriac Vernols.

References

Further reading 
 « Destruction à Aurillac du seul sanctuaire gallo-romain de Haute-Auvergne », Geneviève Charbonneau, 1979, in Revue Archéologia, n° 131, p. 36-53,
 « Découverte d’un temple gallo-romain à Aurillac. Fouille de sauvetage à Lescudilier-Aron », Geneviève Degoul , 1977, in Revue de la Haute-Auvergne, p. 273-331,
 « Les fouilles du fanum polygonal d’Aron », Odette Lapeyre, Régine Roche et Léonce Bouyssou, 1988, in Revue de la Haute-Auvergne, n° 51, p. 37-98. Première publication en 1985 dans la "Supplément" au Bulletin du Groupe de recherches historiques et archéologiques de la vallée de la Sumène.

See also 
 Arverni
 Celtic polytheism
 Gallo-Roman culture
 Gauls

Celtic archaeological sites
Ancient Celtic religion
Gallo-Roman religion
Roman sites in France
Ancient Roman temples
Archaeology of France
Monuments historiques of Auvergne-Rhône-Alpes